Wem Urban is a civil parish in Shropshire, England.  It contains 89 listed buildings that are recorded in the National Heritage List for England.  Of these, three are listed at Grade II*, the middle of the three grades, and the others are at Grade II, the lowest grade.  Wem is a market town, and most of the listed buildings are houses, cottages, shops, and public houses, the earliest of which are timber framed.  The other listed buildings include a church and associated structures, a chapel, a former market hall, a former corn mill, a bridge, a former library, and a war memorial.  For the listed buildings in the rural area surrounding the town, see Listed buildings in Wem Rural.


Key

Buildings

References

Citations

Sources

Lists of buildings and structures in Shropshire
Listed